WFRE (99.9 FM) is a radio station located in Frederick, Maryland, in the United States. It plays Country music and is owned by Connoisseur Media along with its sister station 930 WFMD. Despite the station being located approximately 45 miles (72 km) away from the two closest major cities (Baltimore, Maryland and Washington, D.C.), its signal reaches both markets.

In 2007, Clear Channel Communications was required to spin off stations to comply with ownership limits. The stations were placed in the trust while Clear Channel sought a buyer.

On March 27, 2019, Connoisseur Media announced that it would acquire WFRE and sister station WFMD from the Aloha Station Trust in exchange for transferring its Erie, Pennsylvania cluster to iHeartMedia. The sale closed on May 20, 2019.

References

External links
Official website

Frederick County, Maryland
FRE
Radio stations established in 1961
1961 establishments in Maryland
Connoisseur Media radio stations
Country radio stations in the United States